The North Carolina Department of Agriculture & Consumer Services (NCDA&CS) is a state agency of North Carolina headed by the Commissioner of Agriculture. It is headquartered in the Agriculture Building in Raleigh.

History 
In 1860, North Carolina Governor John W. Ellis encouraged the establishment of a board of agriculture in the state, but the North Carolina General Assembly—concerned about the possible outbreak of civil war—ignored his request. In 1868 North Carolina ratified a new constitution which provided for a Bureau of Statistics, Agriculture, and Immigration within the Office of the Secretary of State. Farmers continued to desire an independent agriculture department, and in 1875 the constitution was amended to allow the General Assembly to create an independent Department of Agriculture, Immigration, and Statistics "under such regulations as may best promote the agricultural interests of the State and shall enact laws for the adequate protection and encouragement of sheep husbandry." The assembly created the department in March 1877 under the supervision of a Board of Agriculture and a Commissioner of Agriculture, who was appointed in April. The commissioner was made an elective office in 1899.

The department expanded over the following decades, and by the 21st century it consisted of 15 divisions, including Agricultural Statistics, Agronomic Services, Aquaculture and Natural Resources, Food Distribution, Food and Drug Protection, Human Resources, Livestock Marketing, Structural Pest Control, and Veterinary Services. In recognition of the diminished importance of individual farmers in the state's economy, in 2001 the agency changed its name to the Department of Agriculture and Consumer Services.

Responsibilities 

The Department of Agriculture and Consumer Services is responsible for promoting agriculture in the state and enforcing various health and safety regulations through the implementation of over 75 laws and programs. It hosts the annual North Carolina State Fair and North Carolina Mountain State Fair and operates four farmers' markets and several agricultural research stations.

Structure 
The Commissioner of Agriculture serves as head of the Department of Agriculture and Consumer Services. The North Carolina Board of Agriculture, which the commissioner chairs, is a statutory agency with its members appointed by the Governor of North Carolina. It creates rules and policies for the department. Under the commissioner are a chief deputy commissioner responsible for administration and assistant commissioners responsible for consumer protection, agricultural services, Western North Carolina agriculture programs, and the North Carolina Forest Service. The department is split into 20 divisions. As of December 2022, the department has 1,753 employees who are subject to employment terms under the State Human Resources Act. It his headquartered in the Agriculture Building in Raleigh, North Carolina.

Gallery

See also 
Government of North Carolina

References

State agencies of North Carolina
State departments of agriculture of the United States
Agriculture in North Carolina